Li Qianfu, courtesy name Xingdao (行道), was a 14th-century Chinese playwright of the Yuan dynasty. His works include The Chalk Circle which was used as the basis for Bertolt Brecht's play The Caucasian Chalk Circle (1948). He notably kept much to himself, choosing living a life of seclusion in the countryside. He is said to have died around 1350 AD.

References 

Yuan dynasty dramatists and playwrights
14th-century Chinese people
Yuan dynasty writers
14th-century Chinese dramatists and playwrights